The 2020 United States presidential election in Vermont was held on Tuesday, November 3, 2020, as part of the 2020 United States presidential election in which all 50 states plus the District of Columbia participated. Vermont voters chose electors to represent them in the Electoral College via a popular vote, pitting the Republican Party's nominee, incumbent President Donald Trump, and running mate Vice President Mike Pence against Democratic Party nominee, former Vice President Joe Biden, and his running mate California Senator Kamala Harris. Vermont has three electoral votes in the Electoral College.

Vermont was won by Biden with 66.1% of the vote, making this his best performance in a state (if D.C. is not counted). Prior to the election, all 14 news organizations projected Vermont as a strongly Democratic state, or a safe blue state. The Green Mountain State gave Biden a victory margin of 35.4% over Trump. Vermont gave Biden his highest vote percentage and margin of victory of any state, making this the first ever presidential election in which Vermont was the most Democratic state in the nation. Vermont also saw the largest increase in turnout from 2016, increasing 14.3%. Biden greatly improved on Hillary Clinton's 55.7% vote share and 25.9% margin from 2016, when third-party candidates received over 14% of the vote. Biden's performance was also the fourth-strongest Democratic performance in state history. Trump carried only one county, the sparsely-populated Essex County bordering New Hampshire, which had voted for the winner from 1980 to 2016.

Vermont was once one of the most Republican states in the nation. From 1856 to 1988, it voted Republican in every election except Lyndon Johnson's 44-state landslide in 1964. However, the brand of Republicanism practiced in the Green Mountain State has historically been a moderate one. Coupled with an influx of more liberal newcomers from out of state, this made Vermont considerably friendlier to Democrats as the national GOP moved further to the right. After narrowly supporting George H. W. Bush in 1988, Vermont gave Bill Clinton a 16-point margin in 1992. Republicans have not seriously contested the state since then, and Vermont is now reckoned as part of the "Blue Wall"–the 19 jurisdictions that delivered their 242 electoral votes to the Democratic standard-bearer at every election from 1992 to 2012. Underlining how Republican Vermont once was, Trump and George W. Bush are the only Republicans to win the White House without carrying Vermont.

Another factor for Biden's improvement was strong support from Bernie Sanders, one of the state's U.S. Senators and a former candidate for the 2020 Democratic nomination who, despite endorsing Hillary Clinton, had received 5.7% of the vote in 2016 as a non-soliciting write-in candidate. Per exit polls by the Associated Press, Sanders maintained a 63% approval rating among his constituents, and his supporters broke 93% for Biden.

Primary elections

Republican primary 
The Republican primary was held on March 3, 2020. Donald Trump and Bill Weld were among the declared Republican candidates.

Democratic primary 

The Democratic primary was held on March 3, 2020. Bernie Sanders, one of the two current senators from Vermont and a 2016 Democratic primary candidate, declared his candidacy on February 19, 2019, after speculation he would do so. Joe Biden, Michael Bloomberg, and Elizabeth Warren were among the other major declared candidates.

General election

Predictions

Polling 
Aggregate polls

Polls

Results

Results by county

By congressional district
Due to the state's low population, only one congressional district is allocated. This district, called the At-Large district because it covers the entire state, is thus equivalent to the statewide election results.

Notes 

Partisan clients

See also 
 United States presidential elections in Vermont
 2020 United States presidential election
 2020 Democratic Party presidential primaries
 2020 Republican Party presidential primaries
 2020 United States elections

References

External links 
 
 
  (State affiliate of the U.S. League of Women Voters)
 

Vermont
2020
Presidential